Dick and Dom's Funny Business is a British comedy television series for children, hosted by comic presenting duo Richard McCourt and Dominic Wood (Dick and Dom). The series was broadcast in a Saturday morning slot on BBC Two and simulcast on the CBBC Channel, and was Dick and Dom's return to Saturday mornings following the success of Dick & Dom in da Bungalow, which ended in Spring 2006. Unlike ...da Bungalow, which was largely broadcast live and ran for up to three hours with inserted content, ...Funny Business was a pre-recorded, self-contained one-hour programme. The first series began in January 2011 and ran for 13 episodes.

The format of the series was Dick and Dom hosting a comedy club-style event;
external shots of the theatre which supposedly hosts the venue are seen as establishing shots during the programme. The theatre's American owner is not himself seen on screen, though his daughter Kelly-Anne Manhattan is part of the recurring cast (played by Kelly-Anne Lyons). The duo introduce a range of guest comedy acts who each perform an on-stage sketch/stand-up routine, and between these the viewer sees behind-the-scenes skits involving the duo, recurring characters and guests, and also interwoven into the show are a number of separate recorded skits and sketches featuring additional cast members and characters not featured in the main show.

The first series consisted of ten regular episodes and three clip shows featuring new links between previously-seen performances; the third clip show also featured some behind-the-scenes footage of guest performers from across the series.

Recurring features and sketches

Stage performances
Each week's show features several sketches performed live before the studio audience by guest comic troupes which have during the series included the likes of Pappy's, The Three Englishmen and Idiots of Ants.

The Devastation Brothers
Two wrestlers in green lycra bodysuits (played by Steven Burge and Tony Way) send a video message in which they trash-talk Dick and Dom. There are also frequent fart jokes in this segment.

Usherettes
Two usherettes at the theatre (male actors in drag) gossip and bicker with one another.

The History of Funny Business
A short skit looking at a comedic or slapstick device, demonstrated by Dick and Dom (as the silent "Subject A" and "Subject B") with the aid of narrator, Richard Mackney.

The TV that switches itself on
Used as a means to introduce a selection of short independent sketches, generally unrelated to the main plot, into the programme. Recurring skits within this segment include:
 Super Granny Nanny, a parody of Supernanny in which a behaviour coach tries to control a wayward OAP; written and performed by "Him and Me"
 Cubs, in which a Cub Scout now in his 40s and the last remaining member of his troop, is given tasks to do
 BEAR, a series of TV parodies featuring soft toys, in a similar vein to those seen in The Adam and Joe Show

Finale
Each edition of ...Funny Business closes with a musical comedy sequence featuring improvisational comedy duo Abandoman, performing with Dick and Dom and the special guest. The duo invite the guest and the audience members to submit phrases to be included in their improvised performance. A running gag is that Kelly-Anne Manhattan asks to perform in this sequence and is usually given a minor or unusual instrument to close the performance with.

Episode guide

Series 1

References

External links

2011 British television series debuts
2011 British television series endings
2010s British children's television series
2010s British comedy television series
Television shows shot at Teddington Studios